Pet Stars is a reality streaming television series starring Colleen Wilson and Melissa May Curtis	that aired on Netflix on April 30, 2021.

Cast 
 Colleen Wilson
 Melissa May Curtis
 Shai Lighter
 Osama Ellahib
 Cierra Marie
 Dane Andrew
 Rascal the Ugliest Dog

References

External links
 
 

2020s American reality television series
English-language Netflix original programming